Newburg is an unincorporated community located in Comanche County, in the U.S. state of Texas. According to the Handbook of Texas, the community had a population of 35 in 2000.

History
The area in what is known as Newburg today was first settled in December 1854. It was originally known as South Leon for the southern Leon River. The community's local Baptist church was organized in July 1872. Its membership reached 48 members in 1875, with the first grave being placed in the community's cemetery that year. The congregation moved to another church building near the cemetery shortly after. A post office was established at Newburg in 1883 and remained in operation until 1908. It originally had the name Lee for local settler Add Lee and was changed to Newburg at his request the year after it opened. Newburg's population was 18 in 1890 and had a general store that same year. It gained a blacksmith shop, a cotton gin, and a gristmill six years later. Another Baptist church was built in 1906 and remained in the community in the 1990s. Its population was reported as 74 in 1936. The church and the cemetery were still in the community in 1940, along with one business and several scattered houses. Its population remained at 74 until it went down to 35 through 2000.

Geography

Education
A building made of logs was used as the first school in the community in 1896. The local Baptist church met at the schoolhouse each year. The church near the cemetery was also used as a school. It had 101 students and four teachers in 1937 and continued to operate in 1940. It then joined with the Comanche Independent School District in the 1950s. The community continues to be served by the Comanche ISD to this day.

References

Unincorporated communities in Comanche County, Texas
Unincorporated communities in Texas